Tuğrul Erat (born 17 June 1992) is a footballer who plays as a midfielder for German Oberliga Niederrhein club SC Union Nettetal. Born in Germany, he represents Azerbaijan at international level.

Club career
Erat made his 2. Bundesliga debut at 9 December 2013 against 1. FC Kaiserslautern. Five days later he scored his first professional goal in a 2. Bundesliga game against Energie Cottbus.
On 9 June 2016, Erat signed a two-year contract with MSV Duisburg. On 9 May 2018, it was announced that he will leave Duisburg at the end of the 2017–18 season.

On 28 September 2018, Erat signed with SV 19 Straelen. He played five games for the club, before leaving on 9 January 2019 to join Turkish club Fatih Karagümrük.

On 15 July 2020, Erat signed with Rot-Weiß Oberhausen.

International career
Born in Germany and of ethnic Turkish origin, Erat plays for the Azerbaijan national team internationally. He has said that "In Germany or Turkey, I had no chance of being recommended as a national player. I chose Azerbaijan because I like that I can gain international experience."

References

External links

1992 births
Living people
People from Viersen (district)
Sportspeople from Düsseldorf (region)
German people of Turkish descent
German people of Azerbaijani descent
Azerbaijani people of Turkish descent
Azerbaijani footballers
German footballers
Footballers from North Rhine-Westphalia
Association football midfielders
Azerbaijan international footballers
2. Bundesliga players
3. Liga players
Regionalliga players
Oberliga (football) players
TFF Second League players
Fortuna Düsseldorf players
Fortuna Düsseldorf II players
MSV Duisburg players
SV 19 Straelen players
Fatih Karagümrük S.K. footballers
Bayrampaşaspor footballers
Rot-Weiß Oberhausen players
Alemannia Aachen players
Azerbaijani expatriate footballers
German expatriate footballers
Azerbaijani expatriate sportspeople in Turkey
German expatriate sportspeople in Turkey
Expatriate footballers in Turkey